Bananas!* is a 2009 Swedish documentary directed by Fredrik Gertten about a conflict between the Dole Food Company and banana plantation workers in Nicaragua over alleged cases of sterility caused by the pesticide DBCP.

The film was criticized by Dole for containing "patent falsehoods". After a screening at the Los Angeles Film Festival in June 2009, Gertten was sued for defamation by Dole on 8 July. The lawsuit was preceded by threats of legal action from Dole aimed against the LA Film Festival, which resulted in sponsors pulling support and the film being removed from competition. Dole dropped their lawsuit against Fredrik Gertten and Bananas!* on 15 October 2009.

In September 2009, the Swedish parliament members Mats Johansson (M) and Luciano Astudillo (S) took the initiative of displaying the movie in the Parliament of Sweden, this being its premiere in Sweden.

In late 2010 a court in Los Angeles decided in favor of the movie crew, making it possible to release the film in the US. A judge awarded the filmmakers nearly $200,000 in fees and costs.

In 2011, Gertten directed the film Big Boys Gone Bananas!* about how the company was sued by Dole.

Cast 
Byron Rosales Romero
Juan J. Dominguez
Duane Miller
Rick McKnight
David Delorenzo
Mercedes Del Carmen Romero

See also
 Oscilloscope Laboratories

References

External links 

 
 
 
 

News
Dole sues 'Bananas!' filmmaker, alleges defamation, Yahoo News. 9 July 2009.
Dole Sues Bananas! Filmmaker, Businessweek. 9 July 2009.
Dole sues "Bananas" documentary maker, Reuters. 8 July 2009.
 Bananjätte stämmer svensk filmare, Dagens Nyheter. 9 July 2009.
 Dole drar tillbaka stämningen mot "Bananas!*", Dagens Nyheter. 15 October 2009.

2009 films
Documentary films about agriculture
Bananas in popular culture
Banana production
Dole plc
Swedish documentary films
2009 documentary films
2000s English-language films
2000s Swedish films
English-language Swedish films